The PWS-18 was a Polish trainer aircraft, used from 1937 to 1939 by the Polish Air Force, a modified licence variant of the British Avro Tutor.

Development
In 1934, the Polish government, looking for an intermediate  military trainer, bought two Avro Tutor trainer aircraft together with a licence to produce the aircraft. Production was ordered in the PWS (Podlaska Wytwórnia Samolotów - Podlasie Aircraft Factory). In 1935, Antoni Uszacki of the PWS modified the design, fitting it with a Wright Whirlwind engine, produced under licence in Poland. The new engine cowling was much longer than the previous Townend ring type, with a carburetor air intake below it. The wing construction was changed from metal to wooden, better fitted to PWS capabilities, and the rectangular wing tips were rounded. Also some other details were changed, such as a tailskid instead of a tailwheel.

A series of 40 aircraft was built in 1935-1936 (1936-1937 according to some references). They were assigned military numbers 80-1 to 80-40. They were not produced in larger numbers because a successful indigenous Polish advanced trainer, the PWS-26, using the same engine, was designed and entered production.

Operational history
PWS-18s were used in the Polish military aviation, among others in Airforce Training Center in Dęblin, an NCO school for minors in Bydgoszcz and in training escadres of air regiments. None survived World War II.

Operators

Polish Air Force

Specifications

See also

References

Further reading

External links

Photos and drawing at Ugolok Neba page

1930s Polish military trainer aircraft
PWS aircraft